Lorinda "Linda" de Roulet (née Payson; born May 8, 1930) is an American philanthropist. She is the former president of the New York Mets of Major League Baseball. She served in the role from 1975 through 1980. She succeeded her mother, Joan Whitney Payson, in the role upon her death, and served as president until her family sold the team to Doubleday & Company.

Early life
Lorinda de Roulet is the daughter of Joan Payson, the first owner of the New York Mets of Major League Baseball (MLB), and Charles Shipman Payson.  Though christened "Lorinda", she prefers to be referred to as "Linda".

She graduated from Green Vale School in Glen Head, New York, and Ethel Walker School in Simsbury, Connecticut. She attended Wellesley College for three years.

Career
Joan Payson died in 1975. Charles Payson inherited his widow's stake in the team, but took little interest in baseball. As a result, de Roulet became the main representative for the Payson interests. She was elected team president of the Mets and named to its board of directors. She became the first woman to direct the day-to-day operations of a Major League baseball franchise. She succeeded M. Donald Grant as chair of the board when he was forced out in 1978.

Charles Payson sold the franchise to Doubleday & Company in 1980. At the time of the sale, de Roulet was succeeded as president by Fred Wilpon. De Roulet remains a fan of the team, attending games after the sale.

Personal life
In 1951, she married Vincent de Roulet. Her husband owned a printing business, and died in 1974. The couple had three children:
Whitney de Roulet, who married Clark Lewis Bullock.
Bebe de Roulet
Daniel de Roulet, who worked in the Mets' front office during de Roulet's presidency.
De Roulet lives in Manhasset, New York.

Philanthropy
De Roulet founded the Patrina Foundation, which supports education and social services for women. She serves on the board of governors of New York Hospital and North Shore University Hospital, on which she is vice chairman of the board of trustees. She has sold artwork collected by her mother, including paintings by Pablo Picasso, donating the proceeds to charity.

See also
 Women in baseball

References

External links
The Patrina Foundation

1930s births
Living people
Major League Baseball team presidents
New York Mets executives
People from Manhasset, New York
Whitney family
Year of birth uncertain
Women baseball executives